Bak Jiwon may refer to:

Bak Jiwon (born 1737) (1737–1805), Korean philosopher and novelist in the Joseon Dynasty
Park Ji-weon (born 1934), South Korean politician and member of the 13th National Assembly of Korea
Park Jie-won (Bak Jiwon, born 1942), South Korean politician and member of the 14th, 18th, 19th and 20th National Assembly of Korea
Park Ji-won (born 1998), South Korean singer, former Sixteen and Idol School contestant, member of Fromis 9
Park Ji-won (speed skater), South Korean speed skater